Dalcetrapib (INN, codenamed JTT-705) is a CETP inhibitor which was being developed by Hoffmann–La Roche until May 2012.  The drug was aimed at raising the blood levels of HDL cholesterol.  Prevailing observations indicate that high HDL levels correlate with better overall cardiovascular health, though it remains unclear whether raising HDL levels consequently leads to an increase in cardiovascular health.

A 24-week clinical trial showed that dalcetrapib did increase HDL-C levels, supporting the agent's desired effect.  Further, the dal-PLAQUE phase IIb trial found evidence of plaque reduction.  Plaque reduction is an anticipated observation following an increase in HDL.

 five phase II trials had started and there was no evidence of the raised blood pressure seen with torcetrapib.

dal-VESSEL phase IIb trial found no evidence of flow-mediated dilatation improvement.  A 17% increase of Lp-PLA2 mass level was noted.  Lp-PLA2 is associated with coronary heart disease and stroke.

dal-OUTCOMES phase III trial passed its first interim review in July, 2011, however, development was halted on May 7, 2012 “due to a lack of clinically meaningful efficacy.”.

The results of dal-OUTCOMES III were published in November, 2012.

A pharmacogenomic genome-wide association study (GWAS) reported that patients from the dal-OUTCOMES study bearing a protective allele at SNP rs1967309 in the ADCY9 gene may have benefited from dalcetrapib therapy. Changes in inflammation and cholesterol efflux capacity may in part explain the benefits associated with the protective genotype. The Dal-GenE trial is currently validating these observations. This clinical trial is a randomized placebo-controlled study to evaluate the effects of dalcetrapib on cardiovascular risk in patients with recent acute coronary syndrome bearing the protective genotype.

See also
 CETP inhibitor

References

Anilides
Hoffmann-La Roche brands
Thioesters
Abandoned drugs